A number of motor ships have been named Star, including:

, originally Merzario Hispania and later MS Nordic Ferry, a car ferry
, a Ro-Pax ferry operated by the Estonian ferry company Tallink

Ship names